The Lone Hand is a 1953 American Western film directed by George Sherman and starring Joel McCrea, Barbara Hale and Alex Nicol.

Plot
Zachary Hallock moves to the town of Timberline with his son Josh to start a farm. In town, young Josh meets a boy named Daniel Skaggs who has an older sister, Sarah Jane.

A shootout in the street results in the sheriff's death. A pair of brothers, Jonah and Gus Varden, are continuing their violent reign of terror throughout the region.

Zack is broke. He works hard farming, but doesn't prosper. One day when Sarah Jane brings muffins and they get acquainted, she joins Zack and Josh on a visit to George Hadley's horse farm. Hadley offers to trade two horses for Zack's first grain harvest.

Hadley strongly urges Zack to join the "Regulators," who try to maintain law and order the area with the sheriff dead. Zack declines, to his son's disappointment. Josh later sees the Vardens ambush and kill a Pinkerton's detective. Josh goes to get Zach and return to the scene of the shooting.  Jonah was hiding nearby and overhears Zack order the boy not to report what he saw.

Zack's wagon, carrying grain for Hadley, is waylaid by the Vardens, ruining the grain. Knowing now that Zack wants to marry Sarah Jane and is desperate for money, the Vardens approach him about joining them on a robbery. Zack agrees. Josh follows his father the day of the robbery and witnesses the crime.

Zach returns to his farm with a new wagon and team of horses.  He lies and tells Sarah, Daniel and Josh that he won the money needed to buy them in a card game.  Sarah Jane marries Zach, but soon suspects his wrongdoing during his numerous nightly disappearances. Zack confesses that he is actually a Pinkerton's man himself, working undercover.  He couldn't risk telling her, Josh, or the regulators, because he needed to find out who the ringleader was.

Hadley is the true criminal ringleader and he kidnaps Josh. A fight develops and Zack is able to take care of Hadley and the remaining Varden brother. His original plan was to leave Timberline once his work was done, but Zack elects to keep the farm and make a family with Josh, Daniel and Sarah Jane.

Cast
 Joel McCrea as Zack Hallock
 Barbara Hale as Sarah Jane Skaggs
 Alex Nicol as Jonah Varden
 Jim Arness as Gus Varden
 Charles Drake as George Hadley
 Jimmy Hunt as Joshua Hallock / Narrator
 Roy Roberts as Mr. Skaggs
 Frank Ferguson as Mr. Dunn the Banker
 Wesley Morgan as Daniel Skaggs
 Denver Pyle as Regulator (uncredited)

References

External links
 
 
 

1953 films
American Western (genre) films
1953 Western (genre) films
Films directed by George Sherman
1950s English-language films
1950s American films